HMS Valeur was a 24-gun French sixth rate named Le Valeur take by HMS Worcester on 2 April 1705 in the Channel. She was purchased at Plymouth by Admiralty Order (AO) 30 May 1705 for £405. She was commissioned into the Royal Navy in 1705 for service in the Mediterranean. From 1706 thru 1708 she was with Admiral Byng's squadron. In Newfoundland, she was taken by the French, then retaken by the British. She spent time in the Irish Sea then was converted to a fireship and then converted back to a sixth rate. she was finally broken at in 1718.

Valeur was the first named vessel in the Royal Navy

Specifications
She was captured on 2 April 1705 and purchased by Admiralty Order 30 May 1705. Her tonnage calculation was  tons. Her armament was twenty 6-pounder guns on wooden trucks on the upper deck (UD) and six 6-pounder guns on wooden trucks on the lower deck (LD).

Commissioned Service
She was commissioned in May 1705 under the command of Commander Robert Johnson, RN for service in the Mediterranean. She took the privateer L'Audacieuse on 19 July 1706. She served with Admiral Byng's Squadron through the winter of 1706/07. In 1708 Commander William Ockman, RN took command remaining with Admiral Byng's Squadron in the Downs then moved on to Newfoundland. Later in 1708, Commander John Hare, RN took command. She was taken by the boats of the French privateer La Surprise in Carbonnear Harbour, Newfoundland on 29 September 1710. She was retaken on 12 September 1710 by HMS Essex. She was repurchased from the Essex by Admiralty Order 13 December 1710. In 1711 she was under the command of Commander John StLo, RN (promoted to Captain January 1713) serving in the Irish Sea. She moved back to North America at Maryland in 1715. She paid off in 1716. She underwent a small repair and converted to a fireship at Deptford in March 1717, however, was converted back to a 24-gun sixth rate later in 1717. In 1717 Captain Richard Davis, RN took over command.

Disposition
She was broken at Deptford by Admiralty Order 14 March 1718, completed by May 1718.

Notes

Citations

References
 Winfield, British Warships in the Age of Sail (1603 – 1714), by Rif Winfield, published by Seaforth Publishing, England © 2009, EPUB , Chapter 6, The Sixth Rates, Vessels acquired from 18 December 1688, Sixth Rates of 20 guns and up to 26 guns, Ex-French Prizes (1704–09), Valeur
 Colledge, Ships of the Royal Navy, by J.J. Colledge, revised and updated by Lt Cdr Ben Warlow and Steve Bush, published by Seaforth Publishing, Barnsley, Great Britain, © 2020, e  (EPUB), Section V (Valeur)

 

1700s ships
Corvettes of the Royal Navy
Naval ships of the United Kingdom